Bay, officially the Municipality of Bay, and colloquially known as Bae, is a 2nd class municipality in the province of Laguna, Philippines. According to the 2020 census, it has a population of 67,182 people.

It is also located at the east of Los Baños, west of Calauan, northeast of Santo Tomas and northwest of Alaminos. The Patron of Bay is Saint Augustine of Hippo celebrating his Feast Day during August 28.

Laguna de Bay, the country's largest freshwater lake, is named after the town.

Etymology
In the old Tagalog language the name Bay derives from the same phonetic roots as "baybay" (shore) and as "babae" (woman) and "babaylan" (priestess).  The name can thus be thought of either as a reference to the shore of the lake, or to a great lady.  In the case of the latter, it has been suggested that the great lady might be the same as Maria Makiling, as her mountain was within the scope of Bay's original territory.

History

Just like the rest of the archipelago, the town of Bay has no record before the coming of Spaniards in the 18th century. Bay existed long before the coming of Spaniards. The Chinese must have come to the lakeshore towns to trade as early as the 9th century. The earliest account of Bay appeared in the conquest of island of Luzon published in April 20, 1572. It was described a great lake of fresh water, 12 league wide and very deep. The villages around the lake had about 25,000 inhabitants when Captain Juan de Salcedo arrived in the area.

Bay is one of the oldest towns in Laguna province, and was the province's first capital. Its original territory covered the areas that are now known as Los Baños, Calauan, Alaminos and San Pablo (in addition to its current territory). The Spaniards pronounced the name of the town "Bah-ee" while the natives called it "Bah-eh." Either way, the similarity in spelling has led to the misconception that the town was named after Laguna de Bay. Instead, the Spaniards named the lake after this ancient Tagalog community.

The "official" recorded history of Bay, may be gleaned from Gaspar de San Agustin's Conquestas de las Islas Filipinas of 1963 and Fr. Joaquin Martines de Zuniga's status of the Philippine Islands in 1800. Miguel Lopez de Legaspi, after establishing the city of Manila on June 24, 1571, ordered the exploration and pacification of the surrounding villages and settlements. Martin de Goiti led a contingent towards Pampanga while Juan de Salcedo Legaspi's 22-year-old grandson led a contingent up to the Pasig river towards the inter lands of Laguna de Bay.

With him was Fr. Alonzo Alvarado, an Augustinian who was very zealous in converting the natives. From Taytay and Cainta, Salcedo proceeded to Bay, Liliw, Nagcalan and Majayjay and to other towns where up-on Fr. Alvarado's intercession, the natives surrendered peacefully with Fray Diego de Espinar and 60 men. He followed the rugged trails of the mountainous village of Sampaloc towards the Bicol Region to look for gold which he found in the gold mines besides the Bicol River.

In 1571, Fr. Martin de Rada, the superior of the Augustinian religious order who came with the Legaspi expedition in 1565, started to build a bamboo and nipa church under the patronage of Saint Augustine along the lakeshore of Bay (i.e. Aplaya, now San Antonio). He became the first parish priest of Bay. On April 30, 1578, Fr. Joaquin de Zuniega stated in the Historical view of the Philippine Island that Bay was organized both as a town and a parish with Fray Juan Gallegos as the parish priest. On the same day, the village of Sampaloc (now San Pablo) was made a visita of the lake side village where it was believed that the tribunal of Ecclesiastical visitors of Bay was held. Fray Gaspar de San Agustin further wrote that in 1586, the Augustinian Fathers organized the visita into a convent with a priest. The provincial Father Diego Alvarez to handle the administration of the Christian natives. Thus Sampaloc which came to be known as San Pablo de los Montes, ceased to be part of the Bay parish.

The powerful Gat Pangil was Datu  of this already thriving community in 1571 when 18-year-old Spanish Capitan Juan de Salcedo landed with Augustinian missionaries Alfonso de Alvarado and Diego Espinar came to claim the territories for Spain.  It was salcedo who took the name of the town and named the lake after it – Laguna de Bay (the Lake of [the town of] Bay).  Eventually, the Spanish came to call the whole province "La Provincia de la Laguna de Bay."

In 1581, San Antonio de Bay became the capital of the Province of Laguna de Bay and remained so until 1688 when the capital was moved to Pagsanjan.

Geography

Climate

Barangays
Bay is politically subdivided into 15 barangays.

Bitin 
Bitin is in the boundary of the provinces of Laguna and Batangas. The word "bitin" is the Tagalog translation of the English word "short." It is also known for its contribution to the harnessing of geothermal energy as a source of electricity in the Philippines, being the site of the Mak-Ban Geothermal Power Plant.

Calo
The history of Barangay Calo started during the Spanish era, where the native Filipino folks lived in the jungle. The Barangay Calo is known for their bird, Kalaw or the Philippine hornbill (Buceros hydrocorax). The Barangay Calo is a place where people often see this Kalaw bird and it is pronounce by the Spanish authorities as Calo.

Dila
Its name came from Tagalog word dila meaning tongue because it looks like a tongue if viewed from the map of Bay. It is the end eastern part of Bay. This is the barangay where the first Jollibee in Bay was built, the "JolliBay Highway".

Maitim
History of barangay Maitim was from Spanish era. The land and soil of this barangay is colored black, hence people called it "maitim" (Tagalog word for black).

Someone said the reason why Maitim is called Maitim because before Maitim is a forest that was burned so they called it Maitim because of coal and ashes left.

Masaya
The Barangay name Masaya means happy. Masaya was part of Tranca and Puypuy during the early times; the upper part from the railway was part of Tranca, while the lower part toward the town was part of Puypuy.  When the railroad was built in the early half of the twentieth century, a train station was built in Masaya making it the center of commerce in the upland of Bay, catering five barangays.  Grocery stores, dress shops, hardware and sari-sari stores sprouted surrounding the train station where people shopped their primary needs, making it a festive place.  When somebody was leaving home to go to the place and another person asked "Where are you going?", he/she will answer "doon sa masaya" and barangay Masaya was born.

Paciano Rizal
Name after the eldest brother of Dr. José Rizal, the national hero of the Philippines. It is told that Paciano Rizal lived here and had a farm in this barangay formerly Barrio Mainit.

Puypuy
History of Barangay Puypuy it was told that a big meteor fall in this Barangay and native people here told to the Spanish authorities that there is a fire falling (meteors) but in a native Tagalog word "apoy" means fire. The Spanish authorities pronounced as Puypuy that is why people in the Spanish colony times called it Puypuy and became a barangay of Bay.

In 2010, jars estimated by experts to date as far back as 800 B.C were found in Puypuy. University of the Philippines anthropologist Dr. Bonifacio Comandante, who headed the team who helped unearth the finds, suggested that the find indicates that "there was a community here and they used the pots and jars for jar-burial", essentially confirming a human presence in Barangay Puypuy as early as 800 B.C.

San Antonio
Named after St. Anthony.

This is where the original and first church of the town situated. Old folks says that the church submerged on the lake (Laguna Lake) when a Super Typhoon hit the town causing massive flooding within the town area.
His Feast Day is on June 13

San Isidro 
Named after St. Isidore Labrador.

The patron of the barangay is St. Isidore the Labrador, the patron of farmworkers known for his piety toward the poor and animals.

His Feast Day is on May 15.

Santa Cruz
Named after the Holy Cross.

Santo Domingo
Name after St. Dominic.

Named after Don Domingo Ordoveza, who once owned a large part of what is then sitio Tabon. The name was given by Donato Ople who served as a long time school principal in the town of Bay.

The patron of the barangay is St. Isidore the Labrador, the patron of farmworkers known for his piety toward the poor and animals.

His Feast Day is on May 15.

The barangay also celebrates annual foundation day and tilapia festival in honor to its well-known tilapia cultivation within the area.

It is one of the fast-growing economy barangays on Bay. The land area is almost covered with commercial buildings and subdivisions (Bay Garden Homes, The Cambria, and soon Camella Homes) that contribute to the income growth of the barangay alone.
This is also the barangay where the first mall in town "CityMall Bay" will be soon to rise.

San Agustin (Pob) 
Named after St. Augustine.

One of the barangays that make up the towns proper.

This is where the St. Augustine of Hippo Parish and town's Municipal Hall are situated. It is also one of the busiest barangays since a lot of convenience stores can be found here and it is near to the town's new public market, "Pamilihang Bayan ng Bay".

This is the home of the Tenorio's Bakery, widely famous for their Monay Bay (Monay Bae).

San Nicolas (Pob) 
Named after St. Nicolas

One of the barangay that makes up the towns proper.

Tagumpay 
Formerly a part of Barangay San Antonio but when it became independent, it became a separated barangay. Both Tagumpay and San Antonio share the same Patron saint, Saint Anthony. This also applies for the feast days for both barangays share the same patron saint. This is the northernmost barangay of Bay and is one of the barangays in Bay which does not have a high school.

Demographics

Voter population as of 2016 is estimated to be 34,195, according to the COMELEC.

Government 
Like other LGUs in Laguna, the town holds election every three years, which will cover from Mayor, Vice Mayor, and up to the councilors.

Infrastructure

Transportation
Tricycles and jeepneys are popular modes of transportation in Bay. Buses are available to Santa Cruz, Calamba, and Metro Manila.

References

External links

[ Philippine Standard Geographic Code]
1995 Philippine Census Information
Philippine Census Information
Local Governance Performance Management System

Municipalities of Laguna (province)
Populated places on Laguna de Bay
Former provincial capitals of the Philippines